"I Won't Let You Down" is a song by British band Ph.D., released as the second single from their eponymous debut studio album (1981). It entered the Australian charts in October 1981 and reached number five; it entered the UK Singles Chart in April 1982 at number 34, peaked at number three the following month. It went on to become the 23rd best-selling single of 1982 in the UK.

Diamond re-recorded the song on his eponymous 1993 album Jim Diamond with a slightly different arrangement, and it remained a staple of his live shows up until his death in 2015.

Music video

The original music video for the song was set in and around the Queensway area of West London. As with the band's previous single "Little Suzi's on the Up", the video is shot in a slapstick comedy style and features Jim Diamond as a well-dressed man trying to win back the affections of his lover (thus mirroring the theme of the song) using presents and taking her to upmarket bars and restaurants. Tony Hymas appears as the video's antagonist; in various scenes dressed in various disguises he makes unsuccessful attempts to assassinate, or maim Diamond's character in order to win the affections of the woman. He is finally successful when, posing as a car dealer, he lures Diamond into a second hand car, which is revealed to be on the end of a crane in a scrapyard being lifted up, whilst Hymas walks away with the girl as the camera zooms out and fades to black.

Charts

Weekly charts

Year-end charts

Certifications

Kate Ceberano version

In 1999, Australian singer Kate Ceberano recorded a cover version of "I Won't Let You Down", which was released in July 1999 as the first single for her first compilation album, True Romantic. She performed the song on Hey Hey It's Saturday.

Track listing
CD single
 "I Won't Let You Down"
 "Trying Too Hard"
 "Feeling Alright" (live version)

Charts

References

1981 songs
1981 singles
1982 singles
1999 singles
Ph.D. (band) songs
Kate Ceberano songs
Dutch Top 40 number-one singles
Number-one singles in the Netherlands
Ultratop 50 Singles (Flanders) number-one singles
Songs written by Jim Diamond (singer)
Festival Records singles
Warner Music Group singles